The East Link Project is a planned high-speed rail project in Sweden, intended to run from Södertälje (just south of Stockholm) to Linköping.

Background
The time plan was originally to start building by 2017, with the goal of trains becoming operational in 2033-2035. The construction cost for the new 160-kilometre railway was calculated to be 30 billion SEK in 2012. A detailed plan from the Swedish rail administration was published in December 2008; the Swedish government gave the go ahead in August 2012. In 2019, Swedish infrastructure manager Trafikverket commissioned Ramboll and Atkins to research and design the East Link Project.

Speed
In 2018, the Swedish Transport Administration decided that the line instead would be designed for speeds up to 250 km/h, citing reduced costs (by 11 billion SEK, from 65 billion to 54 billion). However, this requires 1–2 years of adjusting the original plans.

Route
Long-distance trains would call at Stockholm Central Station and Södertälje Syd before joining the new line, on which there would be an intermediate stop at Norrköping, and reach Linköping about 40 minutes faster than by the existing line. Between Södertälje and Norrköping, regional trains would make additional stops at Vagnhärad and Skavsta Airport, and make a brief detour onto the existing line to Nyköping.

Future expansion
In a little more distant future, a new railway connecting Linköping-Göteborg via Jönköping is planned, called Götalandsbanan. Together, the Ostlänken and Götalandsbanan railways would allow trains to travel between Stockholm-Göteborg in under two hours.

References

External links
 

High-speed railway lines in Sweden